Igutettix is a genus of true bugs belonging to the family Cicadellidae.

The species of this genus are found in Europe.

Species:
 Igutettix fulvus (Chiang, Hsu & Knight, 1990)
 Igutettix oculatus (Lindberg, 1929)

References

Cicadellidae
Hemiptera genera